The Battle of Puerto de Piñones was a battle of the War of Mexican Independence that occurred on 1 April 1811 at Puerto de Piñones, Coahuila. The battle was fought between the royalist forces loyal to the Spanish crown, commanded by José Manuel de Ochoa, and the Mexican rebels fighting for independence from the Spanish Empire, commanded by Ignacio López Rayón. The battle resulted in a victory for the Mexican rebels.

This battle was one of many battles that occurred between the armies of Ignacio López Rayón and José Manuel de Ochoa as López Rayón marched to take the industrial city of Zacatecas for the rebel cause. He had begun his march after hearing news of the capture of many of the rebel leaders at Acatita de Baján. Zacatecas was an important objective because it would provide much needed war supplies to rebel forces and thus, López Rayón was pursued by José Manuel de Ochoa in his march to the city. Lopez Rayon and his army defeated their royalist pursuers but not in such a decisive way that they ended their pursuit.

Aftermath 
On 15 April 1811, Lopez Rayon successfully reached Zacatecas and captured the city. Thereafter, the rebel forces had access to an industrial base with which they would use to make weapons and supplies.

See also 
 Mexican War of Independence
 José María Morelos

Bibliography 

Puerto de Pinones
Conflicts in 1811
History of Coahuila
Puerto de Pinones
Puerto de Pinones
1811 in New Spain
April 1811 events